Dana Nielsen is an American mix engineer, audio engineer, record producer and saxophonist based in Los Angeles. Nielsen has worked with a wide range of artists including Metallica, Rihanna, The Avett Brothers, Bob Dylan, Adele, Neil Diamond, Slayer and Weezer. In 2006 Nielsen mixed the full length, limited edition of Neil Diamond's 12 Songs album and in 2008 Dana mixed Neil Diamond's #1 selling album, Home Before Dark. In 2012, Nielsen was nominated for a Grammy award for Rihanna's album Loud.

Nielsen also composes music for picture and has worked on projects such as Will Ferrell's Anchorman 2 (Paramount) and Casa De Mi Padre (NALA). He has also produced music for several hit television shows including Queer Eye for the Straight Guy, America's Next Top Model, and the Duplass Brother's HBO series Room 104.

Nielsen has worked as an additional Engineer on Grammy winning  recordings by Justin Timberlake and Red Hot Chili Peppers and has worked on a number of records produced by Rick Rubin including Metallica's Death Magnetic, Adele's 21, Slayer's World Painted Blood, Red Hot Chili Pepper's Stadium Arcadium, and System of a Down's Hypnotize and Mezmerize. Nielsen can be seen on screen working as an engineer alongside Rick Rubin and David Letterman in episode 4 (feat. Jay Z) of Letterman's Netflix series "My Next Guest Needs No Introduction."  Nielsen is also featured in the Judd Apatow/Michael Bonfiglio HBO documentary, "May It Last: A Portrait of the Avett Brothers."

More recently, Nielsen has recorded and mixed The Ruen Brothers All My Shades of Blue, mixed Damien Rice's My Favourite Faded Fantasy  recorded, mixed, and played on The Avett Brother's #1 selling album True Sadness (Republic) and recorded Neil Diamond and Promise of The Real for their latest album The Visitor (Reprise).

Partial discography

References

External links
Official Website

Year of birth missing (living people)
Living people
American audio engineers
American record producers
American male saxophonists
American people of Danish descent
21st-century American saxophonists
21st-century American male musicians